Mark S. Berry is an American music and film producer, and the chairman of AMG. He has worked with Grammy and Juno nominated artists such as Carly Simon, Paul McCartney, David Bowie, Duran Duran, Billy Idol, Boy George, Yes, Joan Jett, Cameo and Kool & The Gang.

Berry has attained 36 international gold and platinum record awards for the artists he has worked with as a producer, engineer and mixer.

Biography 
Mark S. Berry was born in Northampton, Massachusetts, and raised in Brooklyn, New York City. In his school years he started making recordings for basement bands in Manhattan.

In 1970, he entered the Institute of Audio Research (IAR) in Manhattan, graduating in 1972.

After graduating from high school (in the same year) in June 1972, he moved to London, UK. He started to work as an assistant engineer at AIR Studios under the tutelage of Sir George Martin and Paul McCartney on the Live & Let Die James Bond soundtrack. His first major engineering assignment and very first credit was Carly Simon's "No Secrets" album. The song  "You're So Vain" from this album was Grammy nominated in 1973 for Song of The Year, Record of The Year & Best Vocal Performance. The song is ranked at No. 92 on Billboard's Greatest Songs of All Time. "You're So Vain" was also voted No. 216 in RIAA's Songs of the Century, and in August 2014, the UK's Official Charts Company crowned it the ultimate song of the 1970s. In 2021, "You're So Vain" was ranked #495 by Rolling Stone Magazine as one of the top 500 Greatest Songs of All Time.

Returning to New York City in 1976, he took a position as Staff Engineer/Mixer and A & R Producer for Vanguard Records. Working there for 12 years, he became interested in hip-hop culture and worked with several artists of the early NY hip-hop movement, including Afrika Bambaataa & Soul Sonic Force, Arthur Baker & John Robie.

In early 1981, while engineering & mixing numerous dance hits at Vanguard Records, Mark met a young New York-based writer/producer named Bobby Orlando, aka Bobby "O". Mark signed him to Vanguard Records after referring him to A&R VP Danny Weiss. Mark engineered and/or mixed many Bobby "O" Vanguard productions & recordings including:

 "Desire", "(The Best Part of) Breakin' Up" – Roni Griffith
 "Passion", "Calling All Boys", "Danger", "Jukebox – Don't Put Another Dime" – The Flirts
 "Native Love (Step by Step)", "Walk Like A Man" – Divine
 "She Has A Way", "Attraction", "I'm So Hot For You" – Bobby "O"

Mark was regarded as an innovator in the hi-NRG genre for developing this signature sound; utilizing a powerful pulsating beat, new wave-style vocals and heavy synthesized bass, cowbells, and the signature tribal temple/wood blocks. The ringing cowbell percussion lines and robotic sequencers heard in "She Has A Way," "The Best Part of Breakin' Up," and "Native Love (Step By Step)" have been described as defining the Bobby "O" trademark sound. Mark's engineering & mixing has influenced various Eurodisco, Tropical House, Techno, Italo-disco, Electronic ("EDM"), and Hi-NRG releases internationally. He has been cited by music historians for his contribution to dance music.

In the mid to late 1980s he started making international dance remixes and worked as a producer of major international recording acts.

In 1991, Mark S. Berry relocated to Toronto and started his work in rock production after signing with Steve Scharf Management. His Canadian productions have included I Mother Earth, two platinum albums for The Headstones, The Killjoys, Nothing In Particular, Fence, Burton Cummings (The Guess Who) live concert platinum solo effort, "Up Close & Alone".

He started attending Innis College, University of Toronto, for an undergraduate program in cinema studies. In 2013, Mark was a keynote speaker at MIDEM '13 Conference in Cannes, France, and Music Industry China (MIC) in Taipei, Taiwan.

Since 2019, Mark has been appointed as a judge for the Short Film category at the Global Short Film Awards in conjunction with the Cannes Film Festival in Cannes, France. He was named to the jury at the 2022 Global Short Film Awards. Mark is also a guest judge and named to jury at the LaJolla Fashion and Film Awards in LaJolla, California for the 2019 & 2022 season.

In September 2019 Mark was inducted into the dance music industry's, Legends of Vinyl – Hall of Fame with an award for his body of work Producing, Engineering & Mixing some of the biggest dance hits of the 70's & 80's.

Mark and AMG have ventured into the feature length film production business as Executive Producers of the 2015 live concert docu-film from rap superstar Drake with "Drake: Homecoming", released internationally through the AMC theatres specialty division, Specticast.

A Shudder channel original feature, "The Sacrifice Game" names AMG executives Mark S. Berry & Duane Farley as Executive Producers along with Philip Kalin-Hajdu & Albert Melamed…AMG is also Music Supervising. The film stars Mena Massoud (Alladin), Madison Baines (Transplant), Olivia Scott Welch (Fear Street), Chloe Devine (Depraved) & directed by Jenn Wexler.

Mark is also Executive Producer of the feature film, CryptoHeads, slated for 2022 release on streaming networks.

In June 2022, Mark announced his upcoming Spring 2023 book release of Risking Nothing Would be Way too Risky for Me.

AMG 
Mark started his AMG business activity in 1998 with startup capital from the music publishing division of Canadian film giant Alliance Atlantis. He launched AMG as a media company to sign and promote artists and insert music into film streaming content. The company is based in Toronto, Canada and has satellite offices in the US (NYC), Hong Kong, China (Beijing), South Korea (Seoul).

AMG is divided into several departments:

 AMG Brand Relations;
 AMG Label Services;
 AMG Artist Management;
 AMG Visuals;
 AMG Music Licensing & Publishing.

The two main music publishing divisions are 50% owned by international music conglomerate BMG Rights Management (New York).

In 2015, the AMG Visuals department Executive Produced Drake's live AMC concert film "Drake: Homecoming".

AMG music distribution is done through affiliate divisions of Sony Music and Universal Music Group.

AMG partnered with the AttackTrax music supervision agency to expand their music into film/TV services.

In 2015, the company started its partnership with Shanghai Media Group (China). In October 2021, the company partnered with Factory Film Studio and started feature film co-productions.

The company has 36 international gold and platinum records.

Discography 

" * " = Top Ten Billboard Dance

Theme from Dune – TOTO (Polygram)
Mixed the title theme from this David Lynch film; performed by the pop-rock band TOTO and the Vienna Philharmonic Orchestra.
Mannequin – "Do You Dream About Me" -ALISHA (BMG), produced and mixed this Dianne Warren song for the main dance sequence in this blockbuster film.
Knights of the City (New World) – Musical Supervisor and soundtrack producer for this feature-length film. Soundtrack included artists such as Smokey Robinson and Stevie Wonder.
Gotcha – JOAN JETT (Sony). Mixed the title theme for this feature-length film. Co-mixed with song producers Jimmy Iovine (Interscope Records – CEO) and Kenny Laguna.

Executive producer discography

External links 

 AMG Official website

References 

Record producers from New York (state)
Place of birth missing (living people)
Living people
American entertainment industry businesspeople
Year of birth missing (living people)
People from Brooklyn